Chasing a Rainbow: The Life of Josephine Baker is a 1986 British documentary film directed by Christopher Ralling about singer and dancer Josephine Baker.

Synopsis 
Documentary on black American singer/dancer Josephine Baker (1906-1974), who emigrated to France where she was a major artist from 1927 until her death.

Cast 
Josephine Baker ... Herself 
Jacqueline Cartier ... Herself
Adelaide Hall ... Herself
Todd Olivier ... Narrator
Alain Weill ... Herself

References

External links 
 

British documentary films
British television documentaries
Channel 4 documentaries
1986 documentary films
1986 films
1980s English-language films
1980s British films